The Ghoubbet al-Kharab or Lake Ghoubbet ("the Gulf of the Demons") is a Djiboutian cove separated from the Gulf of Tadjoura by a narrow channel historically known to have violent currents. Ghoubbet al-Kharab is surrounded by mountains and cliffs 600 meters high, as well as by the Ardoukôba volcano which separates it from Lake Assal. It is very deep (200 meters) and hosts many fish and sharks that grow in the strong gulf currents, and is part of the junction between the African and Arabian continental plates. The cove is visited by divers - "The Crack" (or "La Faille") and reefs like Ras Eiro are popular locations, and scientists like Captain Cousteau visited the region in the 1980s. 

The level of Ghoubbet al-Kharab can rise and fall, varying up to one meter from the sea level because of the tides and winds and the narrowness of the outlet to the Gulf of Tadjoura.

At the far western shores of the Ghoubbet al-Kharab are two volcanic islands: the Devil's Islands.

External links
 Ghoubet
 Goubet al Kharab

Bodies of water of Djibouti
Gulfs of Africa